Gordon Goldsmith (21 December 1915 – 24 August 1992) was an  Australian rules footballer who played with South Melbourne and Hawthorn in the Victorian Football League (VFL).

Notes

External links 

1915 births
1992 deaths
Australian rules footballers from Victoria (Australia)
Sydney Swans players
Hawthorn Football Club players